The Iquicha War of 1825–1828 was a rebellion that broke out between 1825 and 1828 between local royalist peasants from Huanta known as Iquichanos and the army of the newly formed Peruvian Republic.

Peruvian War of Independence
Wars involving Peru
19th-century rebellions